is a Japanese professional baseball player. He was born on July 7, 1988. He debuted in 2008. He had 12 strikeouts in 2012.

References

Living people
1988 births
People from Ibaraki, Osaka
Japanese baseball players
Nippon Professional Baseball pitchers
Hokkaido Nippon-Ham Fighters players